Events in the year 1928 in Spain.

Incumbents
Monarch: Alfonso XIII
President of the Council of Ministers: Miguel Primo de Rivera

Births
14 March - Félix Rodríguez de la Fuente, naturalist and broadcaster (d. 1980 in Spain)
18 March - José María Setién, Roman Catholic prelate (d. 2018 in Spain)
18 July - Manuel Guerra, swimmer (d. 2020 in Spain)
24 August - Antonio Ozores, actor (d. 2010 in Spain)
14 November - Bernabé Martí, operatic tenor
20 November - Pedro Ferrándiz, basketball coach

References

 
Years of the 20th century in Spain
1920s in Spain
Spain
Spain